Professor Molchanov is a Russian (formerly Soviet) ice-strengthened oceanographic research vessel. The ship was built in Finland in 1983 and is now converted to passenger duties for the expedition cruise market.

Research vessel
Professor Molchanov is an Akademik Shuleykin-class ice-strengthened vessel, built in Finland for the Soviet Union. Launched on 28 December 1982, she was named after Pavel Molchanov, radiosonde inventor, on his 90th anniversary. Between 26 January 1983 and 7 September 1991, the ship was used for polar and oceanographic research. She made 34 research cruises as a Soviet research vessel, including three global hydrology expeditions held by Murmansk Hydrometeorological Administration:
28 April 1984 - 10 June 1984, through North Sea, Norwegian Sea, north-eastern Atlantic Ocean, Barents Sea
19 September 1989 - 30 November 1989, through Greenland Sea, North Atlantic Ocean, Norwegian Sea, Barents Sea
12 December 1989 - 22 February 1990, through Norwegian Sea, South Atlantic Ocean, Barents Sea, North Sea, North Atlantic Ocean

Since 2012, annual expeditions have been conducted on board the ship within the framework of the Northern (Arctic) Federal University Floating University project.

Passenger ship
The ship was converted for passenger use, and is now operated by Oceanwide Expeditions for expedition cruising in high latitudes. She has one suite, 23 twin cabins and 2 triple cabins. The public areas consist of a lounge and bar, small library, infirmary, and sauna. The dining room also serves as a lecture room. There are viewing areas on the open deck and passengers are usually welcome on the bridge. She has Zodiac craft for landings and wildlife viewing.

References

External links 
 Oceanwide Expeditions

Akademik Shuleykin-class oceanographic research vessels
1983 ships
Finland–Soviet Union relations
Barents Sea
Expedition cruising